Diego Hurtado de Mendoza y de la Cerda, 1st Duke of Francavilla (November 3, 1489, Madrid – March 19, 1578, Toledo) was a Spanish nobleman.

He became viceroy of Aragon in 1553 or 1554 – 1564, Chairman of the Council of Italy in 1558, and viceroy of Catalonia. He was the grandson of Cardinal Mendoza and son of Diego Hurtado de Mendoza y Lemos and Ana de la Cerda y Castro.

He was the 1st Duke of Francavilla.

External links
 Mélito, Diego Hurtado de Mendoza, conde de (in Spanish)

1500 births
1578 deaths
Nobility from Madrid
Dukes of Spain
Spanish viceroys